Ivanhoe is an unincorporated community in Bulloch County, in the U.S. state of Georgia.

History
A post office called Ivanhoe was established in 1877, and remained in operation until 1933. The community took its name from the 1820 novel Ivanhoe by Sir Walter Scott.

References

Unincorporated communities in Bulloch County, Georgia